Aromobates capurinensis (common name: Sierra Nevada rocket frog) is a species of frog in the family Aromobatidae. It is endemic to the Sierra Nevada de Mérida, Venezuela.
Its natural habitat is cloud forest. The male protects the eggs that are laid on land. After hatching, the male carries the tadpoles on his back to water where they develop further.

Aromobates capurinensis is threatened by habitat loss caused by agriculture, involving both crops and livestock, as well as by logging. Introduced trout are also a threat.

References

capurinensis
Amphibians of Venezuela
Endemic fauna of Venezuela
Taxonomy articles created by Polbot
Amphibians described in 1993